

People
 Kabir Sumon previously known as Suman Chattopadhyay, Bengali musician, journalist, writer, actor and a member of the parliament of India.
 Saidus Salehin Khaled Sumon, Bangladeshi musician from Aurthohin band, also known as Bassbaba.
 Sumon Saha, a first class cricketer from Bangladesh.
 Sumon Barua, a first-class and list A cricketer from Bangladesh.
 Sumon K Chakrabarti, former chief national correspondent  and one of the founder employee of Indian CNN-IBN.
 Sumon - Bangladeshi child actor.

Places
Sumon, Niigata, was a village located in Kitauonuma District, Niigata Prefecture, Japan which was later merged to create the city of Uonuma.
Sum (administrative division) - also known as sumons, a type of administrative district used in China, Mongolia, and Russia.